Radio stations in African countries can be categorized into three main areas: public, commercial, and community. The management of these radio stations is subject to each region's preferred methods.

Algeria

Entreprise nationale de Radiodiffusion sonore (ENRS) is the state public radio broadcaster of Algeria, which owns:

 Alger Chaîne 1 (Arabic)
 Alger Chaîne 2 (Berber)
 Alger Chaîne 3 (French)
 Radio Algérie Internationale
 Radio Bahdja
 Radio Culture
 Radio Coran
 Jil FM
 46 local radio stations of ENRS

Angola

Rádio Nacional de Angola (RNA) is the state radio broadcaster of Angola, which owns:

Canal A
Rádio Luanda
FM Estéreo
N'Gola Yetu
Rádio 5

Private/Other

234Radio – The home of breaking news, music, sports, entertainment and lifestyles. Mobile app available for Android and iOS
 Ecclesia FM - 97.5 FM Luanda (Religious Radio Station)
 Luanda Antena Comercial - 95.5 FM Luanda
 Ngola Radio - 87.7 FM Luanda

Ascension Island
The Atlantic Relay Station is the official broadcasting station of Ascension Island, installed in 1966.
AFN Ascension
BBC World Service
BFBS Radio
Saint fm community radio

Benin
Office de Radiodiffusion et Télévision du Bénin (ORTB) is the state broadcaster of Benin, which owns:

 Radio Bénin (National)
 Radio Régionale
 Atlantic FM
 Radio Parakou

Private/Other

 BBC WS Africa
 CAPP FM
 FM Ouémé
 Radio Adja Ouèrè
 Radio Maranatha
 Radio Tokpa
 RFI Afrique
 RIC (Radio Immaculée Conception)
 Golfe FM
 Océan FM
 Soleil FM
 Frissons Radio
 Fraternité FM

Botswana

 Duma FM
 Gabz FM
 Radio Botswana | Radio Botswana 1 & Radio Botswana 2 (FM 103)
 Yarona FM 106.6

Burkina Faso

Radio Television du Burkina (RTB), is the state broadcaster of Burkina Faso, which owns:

 RTB Radio (National radio station)
 Radio Canal Arc-en-Ciel
 Local RTB radio stations

Private/Other

BBC WS Africa
Horizon FM
Ouaga FM
RFI Afrique
 Radio Gambidi
 Radio La Voix des Lacs
Radio Maria
 Radio Munyu
 Radio Pulsar
Radio Salankoloto
 Savane FM
VOA Africa
 Hit Radio Burkina

Burundi

Radio Télévision Nationale du Burundi (RTNB) is the state broadcaster of Burundi, which owns:

 RTNB Radio 1
 RTNB Radio 2

Private/Other

 BBC World Service Africa
 Bonesha FM
 CCIB FM
 Radio Isanganiro
 Radio Maria
 Radio Rema FM
 Radio Scolaire Nderagakura
 Renaissance FM
 RFI Afrique
 RPA
 
 * Hit Radio Burundi (Official website)

Cameroon

Cameroon Radio & Television (CRTV) is the state broadcaster of Cameroon, which owns:

 CRTV Radio Nationale

Private/Other

234Radio – The home of breaking news, music, sports, entertainment and lifestyles. Mobile app available for Android and iOS
 Abakwa FM
 BBC WS Africa
 RBN
 RFI Afrique
 Sweet FM
 Stone FM community Radio Ndop
 Magic FM
 RSI 
 Balafon FM
 Equinoxe FM
 CRTV radio

Cape Verde

Rádio e Televisão de Cabo Verde (RTC) is the state broadcaster of Cape Verde, which owns:

 RCV Rádio de Cabo Verde (National)
 RCV Mais
 RCV Regional

Private/Other

 Emissora Cristão Rádio Nova
Rádio Barlavento
Rádio Clube do Mindelo
 Radio Crioula FM
 Rádio Educativa
 Rádio Rural Santo Antão
RDP África
 RFI Afrique

Central African Republic
Radio Centrafrique is the state broadcaster of Central African Republic.

 BBC WS Africa
 Radio Centrafrique (National)
 Radio Maria
 Radio Ndeke Luka
 Radio Siriri
 RFI Afrique
 VOA Africa
 Hit Radio RCA

Chad

 Radiodiffusion Nationale Tchadienne or RNT, is the state broadcaster of Chad.
 BBC WS Africa
DJA FM - N'Djamena
 RFI Afrique

Comoros
Office de Radio et Télévision des Comores (ORTC) is the state broadcaster of Comoros, which owns:

 Radio Comores

Private/Other

 RFI Afrique
 Tropic FM
 Star FM
 Sud Radio

Côte d'Ivoire
Radiodiffusion-Télévision Ivoirienne (RTI) is the state broadcaster of Côte d'Ivoire, which owns:

 Radio Côte d'Ivoire
 Fréquence 2

Private/Other

 BBC WS Africa
 Onuci FM
 Radio Jam
 RFI Afrique
 VOA Africa
 Vibe Radio
 Trace FM

Congo
La Radiodiffusion Télévision Congolaise (RTC) is the state broadcaster of the Republic of the Congo, which owns:

 RTC National
 RTC Régional

Private/Other

 Africa No. 1
 RFI Afrique
 Hit Radio Congo

Democratic Republic of Congo

Radio-Télévision nationale congolaise or RTNC, is the state broadcaster of the Democratic Republic of Congo, which owns:

 RTNC Chaîne Nationale

Private/Other

 BBC WS Africa
 Digital Congo FM
 Kasaï Horizons
 Radio Liberté
 Radio Okapi
 Radio Sango Malamu
 Raga FM
 RFI Afrique
 RTBF International

Djibouti
Radio Télévision de Djibouti (RTD) is the state broadcaster of the Republic of Djibouti, which owns:

 Radio Inter
 Radio Nationale
 RTD FM

Private/Other

 BBC Somali Service
 Monte Carlo Doualiya
 RFI Afrique
 VOA Somali

Egypt

Egyptian Radio and Television Union (ERTU) is the state broadcaster of Egypt.

All totaled, there are two partly private and one private radio station.

Equatorial Guinea
Radiotelevisión de Guinea Ecuatorial (RTVGE) is the state broadcaster of Equatorial Guinea, which owns:

 Radio Nacional Guinea Ecuatorial

Private/Other

 Africa No.1
 BBC WS Africa
 RFI Afrique
 Asonga Radio

Eritrea

 Radio Selamna
 Dimtsi Hafash
 Radio Bana
 Radio Zara

Ethiopia

 Afro FM 105.3
 Bisrat FM 101.1
 Debub FM
 EBC 97.1 FM
 EBC FM 104.7
 FM Addis
 Radio Ethiopia
 Fana FM 98.1
 KETO 93.9 FM Denver
 Sheger FM 102.1
 zami 90.1 FM

Harar FM 101.4
  103.7 FM
 Finfinnee 92.3 FM
 Shamanne 107.2 Fm
 Ciro 101.1 FM

Gabon

Radiodiffusion-Télévision Gabonaise (RTG) is the state broadcaster of Gabon, which owns:

 RTG Châine 1
 RTG Châine 2

Private/Other

 BBC WS Africa
 Radio Sainte-Marie
 RFI Afrique
 Hit Radio Gabon

Ghana

Ghana Broadcasting Corporation (GBC) is the state broadcaster of Ghana, which owns:

234Radio – The home of breaking news, music, sports, entertainment and lifestyles. Mobile app available for Android and iOS
 Peny Radio
 Radio 1
 Radio 2
 Uniiq FM
 Volta Star 
 Starr 103.5FM 
 Twin City Radio
 Radio Central
 Radio Savannah
 Garden City Radio 
 URA Radio
 Radio Upper West
 Sunrise FM
 Obonu FM
 Radio BAR
  Atlantis Radio
 BBC WS Africa
 Choice FM
 RFI Afrique
 Sky FM

Guinea
Radio Télévision Guinéenne (RTG) is the state broadcaster of Guinea, which owns:

 Radio Nationale Guinéenne
 Radio Rurale Guinéene

Private/Other

 BBC WS Africa
 Chérie FM
 Djoliba FM
 Espace FM
 Évasion FM
 Horizon FM
 Milo FM
 Nostalgie Guinée
 Radio Liberté
 RFI Afrique
 Voix de l'Afrique

Guinea-Bissau

Guinea-Bissau National Radio (RGB) is the state broadcaster of Guinea-Bissau, which owns:

 Radiodiffusão Nacional do Guinea
 including Several local radio stations

Private/Other

 RDP África
 RFI Afrique

Kenya

Broadcasting in Swahili, English and other local dialects, Kenya Broadcasting Corporation (KBC) is the state broadcaster of Kenya, which owns:

 KBC Radio Taifa
 KBC English Service
 KBC Eastern
 Coro FM
 Pwani FM

Private/Other

234Radio – The home of breaking news, music, sports, entertainment and lifestyles. Mobile app available for Android and iOS
 BBC WS Africa
 Biblia Husema Radio
Capital FM
 Chamgee FM
 Coro FM
CRI Nairobi 91.9 FM (China Radio International)
 Classic 105 FM
 East FM
Easy FM
 EATN Radio
 Emoo FM
 Family Radio
Imani Radio
 Hope FM
 Hot96
 Inooro FM
 Kameme FM
 Kass FM
 Kiss 100 FM
 Milele FM
 Musyii FM
 Mulembe FM
 Radio Italia Africa
 Radio Maisha
 Radio Waumini
 Ramogi FM
 RFI Afrique
 RHI
 Sayare Radio
 SIFA
 Sirwo Radio
 Sound Asia Radio
 Taach FM
 West FM
 Upendo FM
 VOA America
 Kenya Radio Stations Online
Kenya FM Radio Online

Lesotho

 MXXL Radio 91.0 MHz

romanza tv africa

Liberia

Liberia Broadcasting System or LBS, is the state broadcaster of Liberia, which owns:

 Radio Liberia

Private/Other

234Radio – The home of breaking news, music, sports, entertainment and lifestyles. Mobile app available for Android and iOS
 BBC WS Africa
 Magic 99.2 FM
 Buffalo VOA 94.1 FM
 Love FM
 RFI Afrique
 Sky FM
 STAR radio
 UNMIL Radio
 Hott FM 107.9

Libya
Libyan Radio and Television (LRT) is the state broadcaster of Libya.
Al Aan FM (transmits in 105.3 MHz across the country, covering cities: Al Bayda, Al Marj, Benghazi, Jadu, Misrata, Labraq, Nalut, Sabha, Sirte, Susah, Tobruk, Tripoli).

 Radio Libya
 Al-Shababiyah
 Al-Itha'ah al-Wataniya
 BBC World Service
 BBC WS Arabic
 Libya FM
 Monte Carlo Doualiya
 Tribute FM
 Voice of Free Libya

Madagascar

 Radio Nationale Malagasy is the state broadcaster of Madagascar.
 Radio Don Bosco or RDB
 Radio Antsiva
 Radio Television Analamanga or RTA
 Radio Analamanga
 Alliance FM
 BBC WS Africa
 Fréquence Plus
 RFI Afrique
 RFI Musique
 Top Radio
 VOA Africa
 Radio Lazan'Iarivo or RLI

Malawi

Malawi Broadcasting Corporation or (MBC) is the state broadcaster of Malawi, which owns:

 Radio 1
 Radio 2

Private/Other

 BBC WS Africa
Capital 102.5 FM - Nationwide
 Joy Radio
 MIJ Radio
 Power 101 FM
 Radio Islam
 Sawati F.M
Radio Maria
Star FM
TWR Africa - Nationwide
ZBS

 Times radio
 Maziko radio
 Yoneco fm

Mali

Office de Radiodiffusion Television du Mali (ORTM) is the state broadcaster of Mali, which owns:

 Radio Mali
 Chaîne 2
 Radio Rurale

Private/Other

 Aadar FM
 BBC WS Africa
 Jamakan Radio
 Radio Jamana
 RFI Afrique

Mauritania

Radio Mauritanie is the state broadcaster of Mauritania, which owns:

 Radio Mauritanie National
 Radio Mauritanie Régional

Private/Other

 BBC WS Africa
 Holy Qur'an Program
 Monte Carlo Doualiya
 RFI Afrique

Mauritius

Private/Other

 Faith Radio

Mayotte

 Mayotte 1ère (A public radio/television broadcaster owned by France Télévisions for the overseas department of Mayotte.)
 France Inter
 Musique Info Mayotte (MIM)
 Radio Lagon
 Radio Culturelle Mahoraise (RCM)
 Virgin Radio

Morocco

Société Nationale de Radiodiffusion et de Télévision or SNRT is the state broadcaster of Morocco, which owns:

 Chaîne Nationale
 Chaîne Inter
 SNRT Quran
 SNRT Arabic

Private/Other

 Atlantic Radio
 Cap Radio
 Casa FM
 Chada FM
 Hit Radio
 Luxe Radio
 Médi 1
 Médina FM
 MED Radio
 MFM
 Radio 2M

Mozambique
Rádio Moçambique is the state broadcaster of Mozambique, which owns:

 Antena Nacional

Private/Other

 99FM
 BBC WS Africa
 LM Radio
 Radio Índico
 Radio Maria
 RDP África
 RFI Português (África)

Namibia

Namibian Broadcasting Corporation (NBC) is the state broadcaster of Namibia, which owns:

 NBC National Radio 1 (English)
 NBC National Radio 2 (Afrikaans)
 NBC National Radio 3 (German)
 including Other radio stations of NBC operate in several local languages

Private/Other

 99FM Namibia: first and largest commercial English radio station in Namibia, broadcasting in main urban areas as well as by a live stream on www.99fm.com.na or the 99FM App (Android & Apple).
234Radio – The home of breaking news, music, sports, entertainment and lifestyles. Mobile app available for Android and iOS
 Hitradio Namibia: first commercial German-language radio station in Namibia, broadcasting in the central and coastal areas as well as by a live stream.
 Channel 7: Broadcasting on 104.5 FM in Windhoek.  Christian community station.  The widest reach (number of transmitters throughout the country) of any Namibian radio station (except Namibian Broadcasting Corporation).
 Katutura Community Radio: Broadcasts on 106.2 FM in Windhoek. A community radio station based in a Windhoek suburb - Katutura.
 Kudu FM
 Omulunga Radio
 99FM: English medium, commercial radio station. ([www.99fm.com.na Official website])
 Radio Energy 100FM
 RFI Afrique: Broadcasting on 107.9 FM in Windhoek.  Relay of French-speaking radio channel in Windhoek
 UNAM Radio: Community Radio broadcast from University of Namibia on 97.4 FM only within the city of Windhoek and surrounding areas
 West Coast FM: Broadcasting on 107.7 FM in Swakopmund and 106.9 FM in Walvis Bay. The only station in the Erongo Region broadcasting live, 24/7 from Swakopmund. Adult contemporary with a touch of local. Visit www.westcoastfmnamibia.com for further information and to listen online.

Niger

Office de Radiodiffusion-Télévision du Niger or ORTN, is the state broadcaster of Niger, which owns:

 Voix du Sahel

Private/Other

 Anfani FM
 BBC WS Africa
 RFI Afrique
 Saraounia FM

Nigeria

234Radio – The home of breaking news, music, sports, entertainment and lifestyles. Mobile app available for Android and iOS
Don bosco radio (Official website) internet radio; transmitting from Nigeria, Ireland,  Ghana etc. It is operated by youth for youth. It's also available on Android and ios.
Radio Biafra (Internet Radio), transmitting from London, UK and owned by the Indigenous People Of Biafra (IPOB) with its director as Mazi Nnamdi Kanu. It's a pro Biafran radio that broadcasts every two days, mostly by 7pm (GMT+1) and has its reach within Eastern Nigeria and Lagos.
Trybe City Radio (Official website) - online campus station
XMRadio1 (Official website) (New music, digital audio contents and new age radio shows)

Réunion

 Réunion 1ère (Is the public radio/television broadcaster owned by France Télévisions for the overseas department of Réunion)

Radio France is the state broadcaster of France, which also broadcasts some stations in La Réunion and Mayotte. It owns:

 France Inter
 France Musique
 France Culture

Private/Other

 100% Jazz
 Chérie FM
 Exo FM
 First La Réunion
 Fun Radio
 HitFM
 KOI (Kanal Océan Indien)
 Kréol FM
 Nostalgie
 Radio 102 FM
 Radio Arc-En-Ciel
 Radio Est Réunion
 Radio Festival
 Radio Free
 RSL (Radio Rivière Saint Louis)
 Radio Sky
 Radio Sud
 RIL FM - Radio Des Îles
 RZFM
 Top FM

Rwanda

Rwandan Office of Information (ORINFOR) is the state broadcaster of Rwanda, which owns:

 Radio Rwanda

Private/other

 BBC WS Africa
 Choice FM
 City Radio
 Contact FM
 Deutsche Welle
 Fine FM
 Flash FM
huguka FM
Inkoramutima FM
isango star
K FM
Kiss FM
 
 Radio 10 FM
 Radio Flash FM
 Radio Maria
 Radio Umucyo
 RFI Afrique
 VOA-Kigali FM
 Voice of Africa

Saint Helena

 Saint fm community radio (Broadcasts 24/7 and is available on the Internet)
 SAMS Radio (South Atlantic Media Services) (SAMS Radio 1  Broadcasts 24/7 in Saint Helena and is available on the Internet Official website and SAMS Radio 2 The second radio channel that carries BBC World Service, 24/7)

São Tomé and Príncipe

 Radio Nacional São Tomé is the state's public radio broadcaster.
 Maná Radio
 RDP África
 RFI Afrique
 VOA Africa

Senegal

Radiodiffusion Télévision Sénégalaise (RTS) is the state broadcaster of Senegal, which owns:

 RTS Chaîne Nationale
 RTS Chaîne Regionale
 Radio Sénégal International
 Dakar FM
 Mag FM

Private/Other

 BBC WS Africa
 Dunyaa FM
 Express FM
 Nostalgie
 Océan FM
 RFI Afrique
 Radio Future Médias (RFM)
 Sénégal Info
 Sud FM
 Wal Fadjri FM
 West Africa Democracy Radio
 Hit Radio Senegal

Seychelles

 BBC WS Africa
 Paradise FM
 Radyo Sesel
 Pure FM
 RFI Afrique

Sierra Leone

234Radio – The home of breaking news, music, sports, entertainment and lifestyles. Mobile app available for Android and iOS
 Capital Radio - Freetown, Sierra Leone
 Radio France International - 89.9 FM Freetown
 Radio Maria
 Sky FM
 SLBC FM

Somalia

 Radio Muqdisho, the state government-run radio station of Somalia.
 BBC Somali Service
 Somali National Army Radio (SNA Radio) - 90.7 FM in Muqdisho,  www.snaradio.net
 BBC WS Arabic
 Gool FM
 Puntland TV and Radio
 Radio Kulmiye KNN
 Horseed Radio
 One Nation Radio
 Radio Bar-Kulan
 Radio Banadir
 Radio Daljir
 Radio Dalsan
 Radio Daldoon laascaanood
 Radio Gaalkacyo
 Radio Garowe
 Radio Kulmiye
 Radio Maandeeq, FM frequency, independent private radio in Gedo region on Juba Valley.
 Radio Maanta
 Radio Markableey, independent FM radio in Bardera, Gedo
 Radio Somaliland
 Radio Xamar/Voice of Democracy
 Radio Xurmo
 Radio Shabelle
 Radio STN
 SBC Radio
 VOA Somali

South Africa

 All Jazz Radio  (Africa's only 24/7 volunteer driven online radio station streaming daily from Cape Town, playing all jazz from Africa including, Blues, Latin & World jazz)
234Radio – The home of breaking news, music, sports, entertainment and lifestyles. Mobile app available for Android and iOS
 East Coast Radio 
 Soweto iRadio 
 Ugu Youth Radio 
 70vibe-fm - It's about the seventies music! 
 Ntuzuma Fm (Online Radio)

South Sudan

 BBC WS Africa
 BBC WS Arabic
 Bakhita Radio (Juba)
 Emmanuel Radio (Torit)
 Easter Radio (Yei)
 Voice of Hope (Wau)
 Anisa Radio (Yambio)
 Good News (Rumbek)
 Sout al Mahaba (Malakal)
 Radio Don Bosco (Torit)
 Miraya FM
 City FM (Juba)
 Monte Carlo Doualiya
 RFI Afrique

Sudan

 Capital Radio 91.6 FM
 Miraya FM
 Radio Dabanga
 SRTC Sudan Radio

 Voice of Peace
 
 Sudan National Radio
 FM 100
 Salam Radio
 Quran Radio
 Wadi Nile Valley Radio

Swaziland
Swaziland Broadcasting and Information Services or SBIS, is the state broadcaster of Swaziland, which owns:

 Radio 1 (Siswati)
 Radio 2 (English)

Private/Other

 One FM
 TWR Africa

Tanzania

Tanzania Broadcasting Corporation (TBC) owns:

 TBC FM
 TBC Taifa

Private/Other

234Radio – The home of breaking news, music, sports, entertainment and lifestyles. Mobile app available for Android and iOS
 Abood Radio
 Bongo Radio (Online Radio Station)
 Clouds FM 
 Country FM 
 East Africa Radio
 Ebony FM
 HHC Alive Radio (Christian Radio)
 Info Radio 
 Kwa Neema FM
 Radio Kwizera FM-Covering Kagera, Kigoma, Geita, Shinyanga, Mwanza, Simiyu, Mara regions in North-Western Tanzania and the Great Lakes  regions of Africa
 Living Water FM 
 Magic FM
 Mambo Jambo FM 
 Mbeya Highlands FM 
 Praise Power FM
 Pride FM Radio 
 Radio Free Africa
 Radio Imaan (Islamic Radio) 
 Radio Maria
 Radio One 
 Radio Safina (Christian Radio)
 Times FM 
 WAPO Rado

Tristan da Cunha

 Atlantic FM
 BFBS Radio
 Saint FM
 Tristan Radio

Togo

 BBC World Service Africa
 Canal Educatif Francophone
 Radio Jesus Vous Aime JVA
 Radio Maria Togo
 RDT Radio
 RFI Afrique
 Zephyr FM
 Hit Radio Togo

Tunisia

Since 2007, Établissement de la Radio Tunisienne (RT) is the state broadcaster of Tunisia, which owns:

 Radio Nationale
 Radio Culture
 Radio Jeunes
 Radio Tunis Chaîne Internationale (RTCI)
 including Local radio stations

Private/Other

 ElKef Radio
 Express FM
 Jawhara FM
 Gafsa Radio
 Mosaïque FM
 Mounastir Radio
 Radio iFM
 Radio Sfax
 Shems FM
 Tataouine Radio
 Ulysse FM
 Radio Campus Tunis
 Zitouna FM

Uganda

Uganda Broadcasting Corporation (UBC) is the state radio broadcaster of Uganda, which owns:

 UBC Radio Uganda (National)
 Red Channel
 Blue Channel
 Star FM
 Magic 100
 Mega FM

Private/Other

234Radio – The home of breaking news, music, sports, entertainment and lifestyles. Mobile app available for Android and iOS
 Bana U Radio
 Basoga Baino FM 87.7
 BBC WS Africa
 Beat FM 96.3
 CBS FM Buganda
 91.3 Capital FM 
 Hot 100 Uganda
 Impact FM
 Jubilee Radio 105.6 Fort Portal
 K-FM (93.3)
 FUFA FM 102.3 Kampala
 Kaaro FM 103.8 Lyantonde
 Mega FM Gulu 102
 Namirembe FM 93.9
 NBS FM 89.4 Jinja
 Pearl FM 107.9
 Power FM 104.1
 Radio Maria
 Radio One FM
 Radio5 99.7 FM
 Radio ABC
 Radio City FM
 Radio Sapientia 94.4 FM 
 Radio Wa 89.8 FM Lira
 RFI Afrique
 Sanyu FM
 Spirit FM 96.6
 Touch FM 95.9
 Tropical Radio 88.4 FM
 Vision Radio 89.1 
 94.8 XFM
 Radio West 100.2
 Radio Rukungiri
 Radio Ankole
 Voice of Tooro
 Kinkiizi Radio
 Crooze Fm
 Radio Endigyito
 Hunter Fm
 Voice of Kigezi
 100.2 Pakwach Fm
 RFM Radio - 91.1 Iganga
Galaxy FM 100.2

Western Sahara
Moroccan radio stations can be received in the Moroccan-controlled parts of Western Sahara, which include the Moroccan state broadcaster SNRT and its radio channels:

 SNRT Al Idaâ Al-Watania (National)
 SNRT Al Idaâ Al Amazighia
 SNRT Quran
 Chaîne Inter

Private/Other (Moroccan)

 Aswat Radio
 Chada FM
 Hit Radio
 Médi 1
 MED Radio
 MFM Sahara
 Radio 2M

Radio Nacional de la R.A.S.D. is the Sahrawi-controlled state broadcaster and is based in the Tindouf refugee camps in Algeria.

Zambia
The following are the registered radio stations in Zambia. The categories of radio stations include public, commercial and community.
234Radio – The home of breaking news, music, sports, entertainment and lifestyles. Mobile app available for Android and iOS
 5FM Radio Zambia
 AMA Radio 93.3 FM
 Bangwela Radio - Samfya
 BBC World Service Africa
 Beats FM Radio - Solwezi
 Breeze FM - 89.3 FM Chipata, 89.7 FM Lundazi, 98.9 FM Katete
 Byta FM Radio
 Capital FM 99.7 - Lusaka
 Cheke Radio - Kaoma
 Chikankata Radio - Chikankata
 Chikaya Radio - Lundazi
 Chikuni Radio - Monze
 Choma Maanu FM Radio - Choma
 Chongwe Radio - Chongwe
 Christian Voice Radio - Lusaka
 Classic Woods radio - Lusaka
 Cloud FM - Kabwe
 Comet 93.7 Fm
 Faith Radio - Kitwe
 Falls FM Radio - Livingstone
 Flava FM - 87.7 FM - Kitwe
 Feel Free Radio
 Hone FM - Lusaka
 Hot FM 87.7 FM Lusaka
 Iso FM Radio - Isoka
 Ithezhi-tezhi Radio - Lusaka
 Iwave FM Radio - Chingola
 Jive FM Radio - Ndola
 Joy FM Zambia 106.9 
 K FM Radio - Mansa
 Kabangabanga Radio - Solwezi
 Kafue Radio - Kafue
 Kariba Radio - Siavonga
 Kasempa Radio - Kasempa
 KNC Radio - Kabwe
 Kokoliko FM - 94.9 FM - Chingola
 Komboni Radio 94.9 FM
 Kwenje Radio - Chama
 Liseli Radio - Mongu
 Live FM Radio - Lusaka
 Luapula Radio - Nchelenge
 Lubuto Radio - Kaputa
 Lukulu Radio - Lukulu
 Luswepo Radio - Mbala
 Lutanda Radio - Kasama
 Lyambai Radio - Mongu
 Mano Radio - 89.1 FM Kasama
 Maranatha Radio - Kabwe
 Mazabuka Community Radio MAZ FM - 100.9FM - Mazabuka
 Metro FM - 94.5 Midlands
 Millennium Radio
 Mkushi Radio - Mkushi
 Mphangwe Radio - Katete
 Mpika Radio - Mpika
 Muchinga FM Radio - Chinsali
 Mumbwa Blue Sky FM Radio
 Mungu FM Radio - Mongu
 Musi-O-Tunya Radio - Livingstone
 Mwinilunga Radio - Mwinilunga
 Namwianga Radio - Kalomo
 New Generation Radio - Solwezi
 One Love Radio - Lusaka
 Pan African Radio 
 Parliament Radio
 Pasme Radio - Petauke
 Petauke Explorers
 Power FM Radio - Lusaka
 Radio Chikuni 91.9 FM
 Radio Chimwemwe - Ndola
 Radio France International - 100.5 FM Lusaka & 92.5 FM Kitwe
 Radio Icengelo 89.1 FM - Kitwe
 Radio Maria - 88.5 FM Chipata & 94.5 FM Nyimba District
 Radio Maria Yatsani Voice - Lusaka
 Radio Phoenix 89.5 FM - Lusaka (100.5 FM - Kitwe) 
 Radio Q-FM-Zambia
 Rise FM Radio - Chingola
 Rock FM Radio
 Roots FM Radio
 Serenje Radio - Serenje 
 Sky FM Radio
 Solwezi FCC Radio - Solwezi
 Sun FM Zambia 88.5 Ndola City
 Tuta FM Radio - Mansa
 United Voice Radio - Lusaka
 UNZA Radio - Lusaka
 Valley FM radio - Nyimba
 Vision Macha
 Voice of Kalomo - Kalomo
 Walamo Radio - Mpulungu
 Yangeni radio - Mansa
 Young Generation Radio
 Your Anthem Radio "YAR" FM Radio - Kitwe
 Zambezi FM 94.1 ( Livingstone, Kazungula, Zimba and parts of Kalomo, including the added parts into Zimbabwe hinterlands, Botswana and Namibia making it the only Zambian commercial radio station that broadcasting in Namibia)
 The Word Station - Lusaka (Coming soon)
 ZNBC (Zambia National Broadcasting Corporation)
 ZNBC Radio 1
 ZNBC Radio 2
 ZNBC Radio 4

Zimbabwe

ZBC is the state broadcaster of Zimbabwe and operates six radio networks.

State Owned Radio
 Classic 263
 Radio Zimbabwe
 Power FM
 National FM
 Khulumani FM
 95.8 Central Radio

Privately Owned Commercial Radio

234Radio – The home of breaking news, music, sports, entertainment and lifestyles. Mobile app available for Android and iOS
 Star FM
 ZiFM Stereo
 Skyz Metro FM
Capitalk 100.4 FM
98.4 Midlands
Breeze FM
 Hevoi FM
 YAFM
 Diamond FM
 Nyaminyami FM

Community Radio
Ntepe-Manama CRT
Lyeja FM
Ingqanga FM
Radio Bukalanga
Bayethe FM
Beitbridge-Shashe CRT
Twasumbuka FM
Nyangani FM
Avuxeni FM
Chimanimani CRT
Vemuganga CRT
Ndau CRT
Kazambezi FM
Madziwa FM

Campus Radio
NUST Campus Radio
LSU Campus Radio
MSU Campus Radio
GZU Campus Radio
UZ Campus Radio
Harare Polytechnic
Internet/Webcast only

Heart and Soul Broadcasting
Nehanda Radio
Zim Net Radio
Zim Net Radio Gospel
Praise 105.2 Radio
YP Radio
Radio VOP
Shaya FM
Remnant Tunes
Pamtengo Radio
Radio54 African Panorama
AfroZim Radio
After5Radio
SW Radio Africa
UFO Trap Station

See also
 Media of Africa
 Lists of newspapers in Africa
 List of television stations in Africa
 Internet in Africa
 Radio in other continents:
Lists of radio stations in the Americas
Lists of radio stations in Asia
Lists of radio stations in Europe
Lists of radio stations in Oceania

References

External links
FM Online Streaming worldwide database of FM stations
FMSCAN worldwide FM reception prediction
Ecouter Radio Rn Direct worldwide database of MW and LW stations
MWSCAN worldwide MW and SW reception prediction
AfricaRadios worldwide database of MW and LW stations

Africa
Radio